Tanika Liburd (born 20 May 1982) is an athlete representing Saint Kitts and Nevis who specialized in the long jump.

Her personal best in the event is 6.67 metres outdoors (2010) and 6.33 metres indoors (2008). Both are current national records.

Competition record

References

 

1982 births
Living people
Saint Kitts and Nevis female sprinters
Female long jumpers
Saint Kitts and Nevis long jumpers
Athletes (track and field) at the 2007 Pan American Games
Athletes (track and field) at the 2006 Commonwealth Games
Athletes (track and field) at the 2010 Commonwealth Games
Commonwealth Games competitors for Saint Kitts and Nevis
Pan American Games competitors for Saint Kitts and Nevis
Central American and Caribbean Games medalists in athletics